Kim Carlson, Kim Carlsson or Kim Karlsson may refer to:

 Kim Carlson, Miss Iowa Teen USA
 Kim Carlsson, of Swedish dansband Arvingarna
 Kim Carlsson, of Swedish black metal band Lifelover, also known as "( )"
Kim Karlsson, ice hockey player